Santa Maria Valley is a valley in northeastern San Diego County, California.

Geography
The town of Ramona is located in the valley.

Santa Maria Valley is located between mountain ranges of the Peninsular Ranges System.

References

Valleys of San Diego County, California
East County (San Diego County)
Ramona, San Diego County, California